"Camille" is the first episode of science fiction sitcom Red Dwarf Series IV, and the nineteenth episode in the series run. It was first broadcast on the British television channel BBC2 on 14 February 1991.  The episode was planned to be shown third, but was moved forward in the schedule to be shown on Valentine's Day. Written by Rob Grant and Doug Naylor, and directed by Ed Bye. The episode, a parody of the film Casablanca, sees Kryten rescue and fall in love with an android who appears to be the same model as himself.

Plot
Dave Lister does his best to teach Kryten to lie, stating he needs it as a natural form of defence. Although Kryten has some success, he finds he cannot properly lie in the presence of anyone else, and is forced to abandon his lessons when Arnold Rimmer requires him to pilot a Starbug for asteroid-spotting. When they receive a distress call from a doomed ship, Kryten manages to make use of Lister's insubordination training to go search for survivors despite Rimmer's orders against this. The pair swiftly encounter and rescue Camille, the only survivor and become attracted to her – Kryten sees her as another mechanoid like himself, yet Rimmer sees her as a hologram with similar interests that he has. When they bring her back to Red Dwarf, Lister meets her and finds her attractive – to him, she appears as a human female with interests matching his own. However, he soon suspects something is not right with her, when Rimmer arrives, questions her over viewing one of his collections and hears a different response to what Lister gets from her. When Cat meets her, he sees Camille as a mirror version of himself.

Lister informs the crew that Camille is actually a pleasure GELF – a Genetically Engineered Life Form – designed to appear to each individual as the object of their desire, and is in reality a slimy green blob with tentacles. Although hurt, Kryten compliments Camille's true appearance and opts to date her in her actual form, including showing her the film Casablanca that Lister used as inspiration for Kryten's lessons. When Camille finds that her husband has turned up looking for her, Kryten advises her, in a similar manner to the film's ending, to leave with him rather than stay, and stoically waves goodbye. When Lister learns that Kryten lied to her to spare her feelings, he smiles at knowing he has learnt well, especially when Kryten insults him for being responsible for what happened.

Production
For Series IV, recording of the show moved from the studios in Manchester to Shepperton Studios due to the old studio undergoing refurbishment. Shepperton turned out to be a blessing to the show as it allowed for use of the sets for rehearsals in addition to recording. Production starting with Series IV also permanently shifted to Grant Naylor Productions.

The droid version of the GELF was played by Judy Pascoe, Robert Llewellyn's then girlfriend (they have since married). Robert has often joked how he used to complain to Judy about the amount of make-up he had to endure, and yet when Judy wore it she had no complaints. She also provided the voice of the blob Camille, which was controlled from inside by effects artist Mike Tucker.

The initial plan was for Camille to appear as Kristine Kochanski in Lister's eyes; while this later changed, Suzanne Rhatigan was still credited as "Kochanski Camille". Like Pascoe and Llewellyn, Rhatigan and Craig Charles were in a relationship at the time of the recording. The Hologram Camille was played by Francesca Folan. Rupert Bates voiced the Hector Blob.

This episode was not originally planned to be aired first, but was moved forward when "Meltdown" was held back due to the ongoing hostilities in the Gulf War. It was decided to move this episode up to the first in the run due to the fact that it seemed an appropriate one to air on Valentine's Day.

Cultural references
Casablanca, Lister's favourite film, was used for the main plot of the episode and is mentioned and referenced throughout. Kryten and Camille even watch the film in the episode. When Lister explains to Kryten why it is necessary to lie he mentions examples of Humphrey Bogart in the final scene of Casablanca and Nelson's "I see no ships." The ending of Casablanca is also parodied in the Kryten and Camille farewell scene.

Lister watches a vid recording of the television show Tales of the Riverbank: The Next Generation, a parody of the Tales of the Riverbank show and Star Trek: The Next Generation. Lister compares the main character Hammy Hamster the rodent equivalent of Marlon Brando. The television show St. Elsewhere is named by Lister as a tongue-in-cheek defense of his credentials to be ship's surgeon ("I've seen every episode").  His Spider-Man costume is also mentioned.

Steve McQueen and the film The Blob are referenced by Lister after Kryten takes the true form of Camille to dinner. Kryten refers to the actor Karl Malden as an example of a human less attractive than Camille in her blob-like form.

The concept of an alien whom each person sees differently is also a reference to the first-aired Star Trek episode, "The Man Trap".

Reception
The episode was first broadcast on the British television channel BBC2 on 14 February 1991 in the 9:00pm evening time slot, although it was originally planned to be shown as the third episode of Series IV as shown in the repeat runs in both 1992 and 1994. The series' transmission order was changed as it was felt more appropriate to run the episode on Valentine's Day and so it went out first. Further changes to the series' running order came about because of the outbreak of the Gulf War and the subject matter of some of the other episodes, notably "Dimension Jump" featuring the war-hero Ace Rimmer and the anti-war-themed "Meltdown". The episode received a mixed response from fans.

Notes

References

External links

Series IV episode guide at www.reddwarf.co.uk

Red Dwarf IV episodes
Television episodes about genetic engineering
1991 British television episodes